Evretou Dam is the third largest dam in Cyprus and also the largest rock-fill dam on the island. It lies at an altitude of 165 m and is located about 15 km south of Polis Chrysochou, next to the abandoned village of Evretou.  It is part of the Chrysochou Irrigation Project, the construction of which cost a total of CYP £21,000,000.

See also 
 List of reservoirs and dams in Cyprus

References 

Dams in Cyprus
Dams completed in 1986
Buildings and structures in Paphos District
1986 establishments in Cyprus